Danpyunsun and the Sailors (Korean : 단편선과 선원들) is a four-piece group that was formed in 2013, with veteran folk musician Hoegidong Danpyunsun at the center. The members, whose resumes cover a diverse range of music from classical and jazz to folk pop and experimental rock, continue to push for a new pop sound with a mixture of both Eastern and Western influences.

Career 
 Aug. 23, 2013. EBS Space Sympathy Debut 
 Apr. 24, 2014. Naver OnStage 179th 'To Make Teammates'
 Aug. 30, 2014. Hongdae KT&G SangsangMadang Live Hall Showcase <Animal>
 Oct. 2014. MU:CON’s Choice
Dec. 28, 2014, The Hankyoreh - 3rd Place of Album of the Year 2014 <Animal> 
 Apr. 2015. Seoul Art Market PAMs Choice
 May. 2015. Danpyunsun and the Sailors was selected KTandG SangsangMadang Surround Program
 May. 31. 2015. Soundholic Festival "EXIT"
 Nov. 8. 2015. Regards sur la Coree, "Hongdae Night" with Wall of Death at Point Ephemere in Paris
 Nov. 26~27. EBS Space Sympathy with Yun Youngbae 
 Apr. 23, 2016. Hongdae KT&G SangsangMadang Live Hall Showcase <Shofar>
 May. 28, 2016 Brighton in U.K, "The Great Escape Festival"
 Jun. 14–15, 2016. EBS Space Sympathy Record of Iron and Wood 
 Aug. 13. 2016. Pentaport Rock Festival in Inchon
 Sep. 29. 2016. OzAsia Festival in Adelaide
 Oct. 2016. MU:CON’s Choice
 Oct. 3. 2016. Zandari Festa in Hongdae
 Oct. 21. 2016. London Richmix, "K-Music Festival 2016 "
 Mar. 2017. The band was selected Seoul Youth Artist.
 May. 14. 2017. Veloso at Mangwon, Single <Love Song> showcase.

Discography

Studio albums

Singles

Awards and nominations

References

External links 
 

South Korean indie rock groups
South Korean folk rock groups
Korean Music Award winners